This is a list of radio stations in Gisborne in New Zealand.

Gisborne

FM stations

AM stations

Low power FM stations

References

Gisborne
Gisborne District